The 1950 Leicester North East by-election was held on 28 September 1950 when the incumbent Labour MP, Terence Donovan was appointed as a High Court Judge.  It was retained by the Labour candidate Lynn Ungoed-Thomas.

References

By-elections to the Parliament of the United Kingdom in Leicestershire constituencies
1950 elections in the United Kingdom
1950 in England
20th century in Leicester
September 1950 events in the United Kingdom